The men's 200m freestyle swimming event at the 2006 Asian Games was held on December 3, 2006 at the Hamad Aquatic Centre in Doha, Qatar.

Schedule
All times are Arabia Standard Time (UTC+03:00)

Records

Results

Heats

Final

References

Results

Swimming at the 2006 Asian Games